The Woodford Stakes is a Grade II American thoroughbred horse race for horses age three and older over a distance of  furlongs on the turf held annually in early October at Keeneland Race Course in Lexington, Kentucky during the fall meeting.

History

The event was inaugurated as the Nureyev Stakes on 11 October 1997 and was won by the Calumet Farm owned Sesaro, sired by the champion Danzig and ridden by Shane Sellers drawing clear near the finishing line to won by  length in a time of 1:02.96.

The event was named in honor of the Champion sire, Nureyev.

In 2003 the event was renamed for Woodford County, Kentucky. It was known as the Woodford County Stakes until 2006 when it became the Woodford Stakes.

Previously a Listed race, it was upgraded to Grade III status for 2009 and then Grade II in 2017 by the American Graded Stakes Committee.

In recent years the race has gained prominence as a preparatory race for the Breeders' Cup Turf Sprint since it usually held about three to four weeks to the event. In 2015 the event was run off the turf due to inclement weather and was won by Amelia's Wild Ride by the event's longest winning margin to date of  lengths defeating Mongolian Saturday. Mongolian Saturday proceeded to win the Breeders' Cup Turf Sprint on his next start at Keeneland. The following year, 2016, Mongolian Saturday resumed after a three-month spell winning the Woodford Stakes.

Records

Speed  record
 furlongs: 1:01.39 – Golden Pal (2022)

Margins
 lengths – Amelia's Wild Ride (2015)

Most wins
 2 – Morluc (2000, 2001)
 2 – Sgt. Bert (2005, 2006) 
 2 – Silver Timber (2009, 2010)
 2 – Havelock (2011, 2013)
 2 – Bucchero (2017, 2018)
 2 – Golden Pal (2021, 2022)

Most wins by an owner
 3 – Derrick Smith, Mrs. John Magnier & Michael Tabor (2014, 2021, 2022)

Most wins by a jockey
 3 – Rafael Bejarano (2004, 2005, 2006)

Most wins by a trainer
 3 – Wesley A. Ward (2014, 2021, 2022)

Winners

Legend:

See also 
 List of American and Canadian Graded races

References

Graded stakes races in the United States
Grade 2 stakes races in the United States
Open sprint category horse races
Recurring sporting events established in 1997
Keeneland horse races
1997 establishments in Kentucky